Lorta is a small village or Gram panchayat village in Balesar Tehsil, Jodhpur district,  Rajasthan, India. In Lorta there are many government and private schools.

Nearby places
The nearby villages of Lorta are Nathrau, Dewatu, Dechu, Thadiya, Gilakor etc.

Villages in Jodhpur district